The 1979 Florida Gators football team represented the University of Florida during the 1979 NCAA Division I-A football season. The season was Charley Pell's first of six as the head coach of the Florida Gators football team.  Pell arrived in Gainesville with a new plan for building the Gators football program—new offensive and defensive schemes, new assistant coaches, a new attitude and new boosters fund-raising model to support the program and improve the stadium and training facilities.  Pell's plan would produce many on-the-field victories over the next five years, but his first campaign as the Gators coach produced the most losses in any single season in Gators football history, ending with a winless 0–10–1 overall record and a 0–6 record in the Southeastern Conference (SEC). The team, which was plagued by injuries, placed dead last among ten SEC teams. This was the last time until 2013 that Florida fielded a team with a losing record.

The 1979 Florida team had 4 starting quarterbacks: Tim Groves, Tyrone Young, John Brown and Larry Ochab, and John Brantley also played at quarterback, though he did not start. Brantley was projected to start at quarterback, but he was injured in the preseason.

Schedule

Primary source: 2015 Florida Gators Football Media Guide

Attendance figures: 1980 Press Guide University of Florida.

Roster

Postseason

The next year, in 1980, the Florida Gators made a remarkable turnaround. They won the first three games of that season before a loss to Louisiana State crushed Florida's hopes of being undefeated, but they ended the regular season with 7 wins and 4 losses, and in the Tangerine bowl they defeated Maryland 35-20 to improve to 8-4. At the time, this Florida season was an NCAA record turnaround, and this was the first team to make a bowl game after being winless the previous season.

References

Florida
Florida Gators football seasons
College football winless seasons
Florida Gators football